State Road 373 (SR 373) or C.K. Steele Memorial Highway is a  east–west state highway in Tallahassee, in the northern part of the U.S. state or Florida. It travels along Orange Avenue between SR 371 and SR 61. In 2018, the Florida Legislature designated the roadway as C.K. Steele Memorial Highway in honor of late civil rights leader Charles Kenzie Steele.

The highway continues eastward along Orange Avenue as County Road 373 (CR 373) until it reaches Blair Stone Road, onto which it turns and travels until reaching U.S. Route 27 (US 27; Apalachee Parkway).

A spur route, SR 373A, formerly traveled south along Springhill Road (CR 2203) to SR 267 in Wakulla County.

Major intersections

References

373
373